Provincial Trunk Highway 20 (PTH 20) is a provincial highway in the Canadian province of Manitoba. It runs from PTH 5 and PR 582 just south of Ochre River to PTH 10 in the village of Cowan. The highway provides an eastern alternative access option to Dauphin along with PTH 20A.

The speed limit is 90 km/h (55 mph). PTH 20 is part of the Northern Woods and Water Route.

Route description 
PTH 20 begins by traveling for eight kilometres north through Ochre River to the southwestern edge of Dauphin Lake before turning west toward Dauphin. It then turns north at the Dauphin city limits (PTH 20A actually enters Dauphin) to provide access to the western shores of Dauphin Lake and Lake Winnipegosis. Along this stretch, PTH 20 passes through the town of Winnipegosis. The highway continues north to the village of Camperville, where it turns west. The highway meets PR 272 approximately one kilometre later. 

From this point, PTH 20 travels in an east-west direction while maintaining its designation as a north-south highway. It skirts the southern boundary of the Swan-Pelican Provincial Forest before reaching its northern terminus with PTH 10 at Cowan.

History
Highway 20 was originally designated in 1928 from PTH 2 east of Carroll to Boissevain. This became part of PTH 25 in 1929 (which became part of PTH 10 in 1939).

When the current version of PTH 20 first appeared on the 1948/49 Manitoba Highway Map, it was originally a short north-south highway spanning  that connected PTH 5 just east of Dauphin to Winnipegosis.

The highway was extended to Camperville in 1957, and completed to its current northbound terminus at Cowan in 1959.

The segment of the highway between Dauphin and its current southern terminus was originally part of PTH 5 before its current section between Ochre River and PTH 10 south was constructed and opened to traffic in 1959. PTH 20 was then extended along the old section of PTH 5 at that point, with a small spur between the original southern terminus and Dauphin's city center being redesignated as PTH 20A.

Major intersections

References

External links 
Manitoba Official Map - Western Manitoba
Manitoba Official Map - West Central

020
Northern Woods and Water Route
Dauphin, Manitoba